Barbara Montgomery (born June 25, 1939) is an American stage, television and film actress, and theatrical and film director. She is best known for her performance in Amen (1986-1990).

Career
Born in Queens, Montgomery began her career on the stage in the 1960s in Off-Off-Broadway theatrical groups. She was a member of Negro Ensemble Company and the La MaMa Experimental Theatre Club. In the early 1970s, she starred as "Mama" in the Off-Broadway production of My Sister, My Sister for which she earned an Obie Award. The play later ran on Broadway from April to August 1974 for which Montgomery reprised her role.

In 1986, Montgomery won the role of Cassietta Hetebrink on the NBC sitcom Amen. Montgomery played the role for four years before leaving the series in 1990. Later that year, she starred in the short-lived ABC program Married People as Olivia Williams. She has also appeared on many shows such as A Different World, The Fresh Prince of Bel-Air, Disneyland, and Living Single.

In 2013, Montgomery made her directorial debut with the historical film Mitote, starring Ruby Dee and S. Epatha Merkerson.

Work

References

External links
 
 
 

1939 births
20th-century American actresses
21st-century American actresses
Actresses from New York (state)
African-American actresses
American film actresses
American musical theatre actresses
American stage actresses
American television actresses
American theatre directors
Women theatre directors
American women film directors
Living people
People from Queens, New York
Film directors from New York City
20th-century African-American women singers
21st-century African-American women
21st-century African-American people